General Tobias Joaquim Dai (born November 25, 1950) was Minister of National Defence of Mozambique from 2000 to 2008. He took office on January 17, 2000 and was replaced by Filipe Nhussi in March 2008.

Dai is the brother-in-law of President Armando Guebuza.

References 

1950 births
Defence ministers of Mozambique
Living people
FRELIMO politicians
Recipients of the Eduardo Mondlane Order